This is a list of species in the genus Cymatodera.

Cymatodera species

 Cymatodera aegra Wolcott, 1921
 Cymatodera aegra-complex 
 Cymatodera aethiops Wolcott, 1910
 Cymatodera angustata Spinola, 1844
 Cymatodera antennata Schaeffer, 1908
 Cymatodera arizonica Schaeffer, 1908
 Cymatodera balteata LeConte, 1854  (banded checkered beetle)
 Cymatodera belfragei Horn, 1876
 Cymatodera bicolor (Say, 1825)
 Cymatodera brevicollis Schaeffer, 1917
 Cymatodera californica Horn, 1868
 Cymatodera cazierorum Barr, 1972
 Cymatodera cephalica Schaeffer, 1908
 Cymatodera chisosensis Barr, 1972
 Cymatodera corporaali Barr, 1948
 Cymatodera cylindricollis Chevrolat, 1833
 Cymatodera decipiens Fall, 1906
 Cymatodera delicatula Fall, 1906
 Cymatodera dietrichi Barr, 1952
 Cymatodera fascifera LeConte, 1866
 Cymatodera flavosignata Schaeffer, 1908
 Cymatodera floridana Barr, 1972
 Cymatodera fuchsii Schaeffer, 1904
 Cymatodera fuscula LeConte, 1852
 Cymatodera hopei Gray in Griffith, 1832
 Cymatodera horni Wolcott, 1910
 Cymatodera hurdi Barr, 1972
 Cymatodera ignava Rifkind, Toledo and Corona, 2010
 Cymatodera inornata (Say, 1835)  (inornate checkered beetle)
 Cymatodera knausi Wolcott, 1921
 Cymatodera laevicollis Schaeffer, 1908
 Cymatodera latefascia Schaeffer, 1904
 Cymatodera lauta Barr, 1972
 Cymatodera linsleyi Barr, 1972
 Cymatodera longicornis LeConte, 1849
 Cymatodera maculifera Barr, 1948
 Cymatodera mitchelli Chapin, 1927
 Cymatodera morosa LeConte, 1858
 Cymatodera neomexicana Knull, 1934
 Cymatodera obliquefasciata Schaeffer, 1904
 Cymatodera oblita Horn, 1876
 Cymatodera ovipennis LeConte, 1859
 Cymatodera pallida Schaeffer, 1908
 Cymatodera parkeri Barr, 1972
 Cymatodera pseudotsugae Barr, 1947
 Cymatodera pubescens Wolcott, 1909
 Cymatodera punctata LeConte, 1852
 Cymatodera puncticollis Bland, 1863
 Cymatodera purpuricollis Horn, 1894
 Cymatodera santarosae Schaeffer, 1905
 Cymatodera schwarzi Wolcott, 1921
 Cymatodera scitula Barr, 1972
 Cymatodera serena Barr, 1972
 Cymatodera sirpata Horn, 1885
 Cymatodera snowi Wolcott, 1910
 Cymatodera sobara Barr, 1960
 Cymatodera sodalis Barr, 1972
 Cymatodera tlahuica Rifkind, Toledo and Corona, 2010
 Cymatodera tricolor Skinner, 1905
 Cymatodera turbata 
 Cymatodera tuta Wolcott, 1910
 Cymatodera tutoides Barr, 1972
 Cymatodera undulata (Say, 1825)  (undulate checkered beetle)
 Cymatodera uniformis Schaeffer, 1905
 Cymatodera usta LeConte, 1858
 Cymatodera vandykei Schaeffer, 1904
 Cymatodera vulgivaga Barr, 1972
 Cymatodera werneri Barr, 1952
 Cymatodera wolcotti Barr, 1950
 Cymatodera xanti Horn, 1876
 Cymatodera xavierae Knull, 1940
 Cymatodera zosterops Barr, 1972

References